Weyman is both a surname and a given name. Notable people with the name include:

Andrew D. Weyman, American television director and producer
Daniel Weyman (born 1977), English actor
Michael Weyman (born 1984), Australian rugby league footballer
Stanley J. Weyman (1855–1928), English novelist
Stanley Clifford Weyman (1890–1960), American multiple impostor
Weyman Bouchery (1683–1712), English Latin poet
Weyman Kevin (1961-), English fish merchant